Altos may refer to:
Altos (Mygdonia), a town of ancient Greece
Altos (Paraguay)
Altos, Brazil, a municipality in Piauí
Associação Atlética de Altos, a football team in the municipality of Altos
 Los Altos (Jalisco), a geographic region in the eastern part of the Mexican state of Jalisco
Altos Computer Systems, an early microcomputer manufacturer

See also

Antos (name)